Rendezvous with Lindley Evans (sometimes listed in TV listings as Pianist Lindley Evans) was an Australian television series featuring pianist Lindley Evans. Running for about a year, the weekly series aired from circa 27 July 1958 to either June or July 1959. A 15-minute series broadcast on Sundays on Sydney station ATN-7; it was listed as being a live production.

Little information is available on the series.

References

External links
 

Seven Network original programming
1958 Australian television series debuts
1959 Australian television series endings
Australian music television series
English-language television shows
Black-and-white Australian television shows
Australian live television series